Endee is an unincorporated community on the route of historic Route 66 in Quay County, New Mexico, United States. The town was founded circa 1885 and named after the brand of the ND Ranch. A post office operated in Endee from 1886 to 1955. In 1952, Route 66 was rerouted so it bypassed Endee.

Endee was a supply center for ranches in the area. In 1946, the town consisted of a grocery store, a gas station with "modern restrooms" and a repair garage, a school, and a scattering of cabins.

References

Unincorporated communities in New Mexico
Unincorporated communities in Quay County, New Mexico
Ghost towns in New Mexico